Lichtenstein Castle may refer to the following castles:

Austria 
 Liechtenstein Castle (Maria Enzersdorf), near Maria Enzersdorf in Lower Austria, bordering Vienna

Germany 
 Lichtenstein Castle (Württemberg) near Lichtenstein-Honau, Baden-Württemberg
 Lichtenstein Castle (Lower Franconia) in the municipality of Pfarrweisach, Lower Franconia, Bavaria
 Lichtenstein Castle (Greifenstein) in the municipality of Greifenstein, Hesse

Switzerland 
 Lichtenstein Castle (Graubünden), in the municipality of Haldenstein, Canton of Graubünden